In June 1962, inmates Clarence Anglin, John Anglin, and Frank Morris escaped from Alcatraz Federal Penitentiary, a maximum-security prison  located on Alcatraz Island in San Francisco Bay. Late on the night of June 11 or early morning of June 12, the three men tucked papier-mâché heads resembling their own likenesses into their beds, broke out of the main prison building via ventilation ducts and an unused utility corridor, and departed the island aboard an improvised inflatable raft to an uncertain fate. A fourth conspirator, Allen West, failed in his escape attempt and remained on the island.

Hundreds of leads were pursued by the Federal Bureau of Investigation (FBI) and local law enforcement officials in the ensuing years, but no conclusive evidence has ever surfaced favoring the success or failure of the attempt. Numerous theories of widely varying plausibility have been proposed by authorities, reporters, family members, and amateur enthusiasts. In 1979 the FBI officially concluded, on the basis of circumstantial evidence and a preponderance of expert opinion, that the men drowned in the frigid waters of San Francisco Bay without reaching the mainland. The U.S. Marshals Service case file remains open and active, however, and Morris and the Anglin brothers remain on its wanted list.   

New circumstantial and material evidence has continued to surface, stoking new debates on whether the inmates managed to survive.

Inmates

Frank Morris

Frank Lee Morris (born September 1, 1926) was born in Washington, D.C.  His parents abandoned him when he was 11, so he spent the rest of his childhood in foster homes, an orphan. He was convicted of his first criminal offense at 13, and by his late teens had been arrested for crimes ranging from narcotics possession to armed robbery. He spent most of his early years in jail serving lunch to prisoners. Later, he was arrested for grand larceny in Miami Beach, car theft, and armed robbery. Morris reportedly ranked in the top 2% of the general population in intelligence, as measured by IQ testing (133). He served time in Florida and Georgia, then escaped from the Louisiana State Penitentiary while serving 10 years for bank robbery. He was recaptured a year later while committing a burglary and sent to Alcatraz on January 20, 1960, as inmate number AZ1441.

John and Clarence Anglin

John William (born May2, 1930) and Clarence (born May11, 1931) were born into a family of 14children in Donalsonville, Georgia. Each June they migrated north as far as Michigan to pick cherries. Clarence and John were reportedly inseparable as youngsters; they became skilled swimmers, and amazed their siblings by swimming in the frigid waters of Lake Michigan as ice still floated on its surface.

Clarence was first caught breaking into a service station when he was 14years old. The brothers began robbing banks and other establishments as a team in the early 1950s, usually targeting businesses that were closed, to ensure that no one got injured. They claimed that they used a weapon only once, during a bank heist – a toy gun. In 1958, John, Clarence, and Alfred Anglin robbed the Columbia Savings Bank Building in Columbia, Alabama. All received 35-year sentences, which they served at Florida State Prison, Leavenworth Federal Penitentiary, and then Atlanta Penitentiary. After repeated attempts to escape from the Atlanta facility, John and Clarence were transferred to Alcatraz. John arrived on October24, 1960, as inmate AZ1476, and Clarence on January10, 1961, as inmate AZ1485.

Allen West

Allen West (March 25, 1929 – December 21, 1978) was born in New York City. West was arrested over 20 times throughout his lifetime.  He was imprisoned for car theft in 1955, first at Atlanta Penitentiary, then at Florida State Prison. After an escape attempt from the Florida facility, he was transferred to Alcatraz in 1957 at the age of 28 and became inmate AZ1335.

Escape
The four inmates all knew each other from previous incarcerations in Florida and Georgia. When they were assigned adjacent cells in December 1961, they began formulating an escape plan under the leadership of Morris.  Over the subsequent six months, they widened the ventilation ducts beneath their sinks using discarded saw blades found on the prison grounds, metal spoons from the mess hall, and an electric drill improvised from the motor of a vacuum cleaner. The men concealed their work with painted cardboard, and masked the noise with Morris’s accordion on top of the ambient din of music hour.

Once the holes were wide enough to pass through, the men accessed the unguarded utility corridor directly behind their cells' tier and climbed to the vacant top level of the cellblock, where they set up a clandestine workshop. Here, using over fifty raincoats among other stolen and donated materials, they constructed life preservers, based on a design Morris found in the March 1962 issue of Popular Mechanics, with the article, Your Life Preserver — How will it behave if you need it?. Morris found other ideas in magazines; resin to make a lamp shade in the November 1960 issue of Popular Mechanics, and Signposts of Water Safety about channel buoys indicating course and navigation hazards, in the May 21, 1962 issue of Sports Illustrated. They also assembled a six-by-fourteen-foot rubber raft, the seams carefully stitched by hand and sealed with liquid plastic
available in the shops, and heat from nearby steam pipes. Paddles were improvised from plywood and screws. Finally, they climbed a ventilation shaft to the roof and removed the rivets holding a large fan in place.

The men concealed their absence while working outside their cells, and after the escape itself, by sculpting dummy heads from a hand-made papier-mâché-like mixture of soap, toothpaste, concrete dust, and toilet paper, and giving them a realistic appearance with paint from the maintenance shop and hair from the barbershop floor. With towels and clothing piled under the blankets in their bunks and the dummy heads positioned on the pillows, they appeared to be sleeping.

On the night of June 11, 1962, with all preparations in place, the men initiated their plan. West discovered that the cement he had used to reinforce crumbling concrete around his vent had hardened, narrowing the opening and fixing the grill in place. By the time he managed to remove the grill and re-widen the hole, the others had left without him. He returned to his cell and went to sleep.

From the service corridor, Morris and the Anglins climbed the ventilation shaft to the roof. Guards heard a loud crash as they broke out of the shaft, but nothing further was heard, and the source of the noise was not investigated. Hauling their gear with them, they descended  to the ground by sliding down a kitchen vent pipe, then climbed two  barbed-wire perimeter fences. At the northeast shoreline, near the power plant—a blind spot in the prison's network of searchlights and gun towers—they inflated their raft with a concertina stolen from another inmate and modified to serve as a bellows. At some time after 10:00p.m., investigators estimated, they boarded the raft, launched it and departed toward their objective, Angel Island, two miles to the north.

Investigation
The escape was not discovered until the morning of June 12 due to the successful dummy head ruse. Multiple military and law-enforcement agencies conducted an extensive air, sea, and land search over the next 10 days. On the same day and in the same general location, workers on another boat found a wallet wrapped in plastic complete with names, addresses, and photos of the Anglins' friends and relatives. On June 21, shreds of raincoat material, believed to be remnants of the raft, were found on a beach not far from the Golden Gate Bridge. According to the final FBI report, no other physical evidence was found.

FBI agents surmised early on that the men had drowned.  They cited the fact that "the individuals' personal effects were the only belongings they had, and the men would have drowned before leaving them behind." However, no human remains were found at the time. 

On July 17, a month after the escape, a Norwegian ship, SS Norefjell, spotted a body floating in the ocean  from the Golden Gate Bridge. The ship did not retrieve the body and did not report the sighting until October. San Francisco County Coroner Henry Turkel cast doubt on speculation that it could have been one of the escapees, emphasizing the improbability that a body would still be floating on the surface of the ocean after more than a month; instead, Turkel proposed that the corpse may have been that of Cecil Phillip Herrman, a 34-year-old unemployed baker who had jumped from the Golden Gate Bridge five days earlier. Several coroners from neighboring counties challenged Turkel's opinion, stating that it was possible the remains belonged to one of the escapees. 

FBI investigators announced their official position that, while it was theoretically possible for the men to have reached Angel Island,  the odds of them having survived the turbulent currents and frigid waters of the bay were negligible. According to the final FBI report, West said that they had planned to steal clothes and a car upon reaching land, but no such thefts were reported in the immediate area.

Aftermath
West was the only conspirator not to participate in the actual escape. He fully cooperated with the investigation and was therefore not charged for his role.

West was transferred to McNeil Island, Washington after Alcatraz was deactivated in 1963, and later, back to Atlanta Penitentiary. After serving his sentence, followed by two additional sentences in Georgia and Florida, he was released in 1967, only to be arrested again in Florida the following year on charges of grand larceny. At Florida State Prison, he fatally stabbed another inmate in October 1972, in what may have been a racist hate crime. He was serving multiple sentences, including life imprisonment on the murder conviction, when he died of acute peritonitis in 1978.

He was found there by teenagers, suffering from hypothermia and exhaustion. After recovering in Letterman Army Hospital, he was immediately returned to Alcatraz. Scott is the only documented case of an Alcatraz inmate reaching the shore by swimming.
Today, a multitude of athletes swim the same Alcatraz-to-Fort Point route as part of two annual triathlon events.

Because Alcatraz cost more to operate than other prisons (nearly $10 per prisoner per day, as opposed to $3 per prisoner per day at Atlanta), and because 50 years of salt water saturation had severely eroded the buildings, Attorney General Robert F. Kennedy ordered the facility to be closed on March 21, 1963.

The FBI closed its file on December 31, 1979, after a 17-year investigation. Their official finding was that the prisoners most likely drowned in the cold waters of the bay while attempting to reach Angel Island. They cited the remnants found of the raft, as well as the personal effects of the men, as evidence that the raft broke up and sank at some point and the three convicts succumbed to hypothermia, with their bodies swept out to sea by the rapid currents of the San Francisco Bay.

The FBI did hand their evidence over to the U.S. Marshals Service, whose investigation remains open. As Deputy U.S. Marshal Michael Dyke told NPR, "There's an active warrant, and the Marshals Service doesn't give up looking for people." In 2009, Dyke said that he was still receiving leads on a regular basis.  The warrant will expire in 2030, when all of the missing men would be at least 100 years old.

Reported sightings
 
In January 1965, the FBI investigated a rumor that Clarence Anglin was living in Brazil. Agents were dispatched to South America but found no direct evidence that he was there.

A man called the Bureau in 1967 claiming to have been Morris's classmate and to have known him for 30 years. He said he had bumped into him in Maryland and described him as having "a small beard and moustache", but refused to give further details.

Family members of the Anglin brothers occasionally received postcards and messages over the years. Most were unsigned; one was signed "Jerry", and another "Jerry and Joe". The family also produced a Christmas card, purportedly received in the family mailbox in 1962, saying, "To Mother, from John. Merry Christmas." Another of the Anglins' 11 siblings, Robert, also said that sometimes the phone would ring and all that could be heard was breathing on the other end; Robert said, "I suppose all that could have been pranks, but maybe it was my brothers." The mother of the Anglin brothers received flowers anonymously every Mother's Day until her death in 1973, and two very tall, unusual women in heavy makeup were reported to have attended her funeral. Federal officials say that in the mid-to-late 1960s and into the 1970s there were "six or seven" sightings reported of the Anglin brothers, all in north Florida or Georgia. Robert said that in 1989, when the father of the Anglin brothers died, two strangers in beards showed up at the funeral home. According to Robert, "They stood in front of the casket looking at the body a few minutes ⁠— they ⁠⁠... wept ⁠— then, they walked out."

In 1989, a woman who identified herself only as "Cathy" called Unsolved Mysteries tip line to report that a photo of Clarence Anglin matched the description of a man who lived on a farm near Marianna, Florida. Another woman also recognized a photo of Clarence Anglin, and said he lived near Marianna. She correctly identified his eye color, height, and other physical features. Another witness claimed that a sketch of Frank Morris bore a striking resemblance to a man she had seen in the same area.

Claims and developments
A day after the escape, a man claiming to be John Anglin called a lawyer, Eugenia MacGowan, in San Francisco to arrange a meeting with the U.S. Marshals office. When MacGowan refused, the caller terminated the phone call.

Robert Checchi, a San Francisco police officer, said that at 1:00 a.m. on the morning of June 12, he saw an "illegal" boat in the bay near Alcatraz. A few minutes later, the boat left, heading under the Golden Gate Bridge. This led to speculation that the prisoners might have enlisted outside confederates to pick them up.  The FBI dismissed Checchi's account out of hand.

In 1993, a former Alcatraz inmate named Thomas Kent told the television program America's Most Wanted that he had helped plan the escape, and claimed to have provided "significant new leads" to investigators. He said that Clarence Anglin's girlfriend had agreed to meet the men on shore and drive them to Mexico. He declined to participate in the actual escape, he said, because he could not swim. Officials were skeptical of Kent's account, because he had been paid $2,000 for the interview.

A man named John Leroy Kelly dictated an extended deathbed confession to his nurse in 1993. Kelly claimed that he and a partner picked up Morris and the Anglins in a boat and transported them to the Seattle, Washington area. Later, under the guise of transporting them to Canada, Kelly and his partner murdered the escapees to get the $40,000 their families had collected for them. At a location in Seattle where Kelly claimed the three escapees were buried, no human remains were found.

A 2003 MythBusters episode on the Discovery Channel tested the feasibility of an escape from the island aboard a raft constructed with the same materials and tools available to the inmates, and concluded that it was "possible". 

A 2011 documentary on the National Geographic Channel entitled Vanished from Alcatraz reported that contrary to the official FBI report, a raft was discovered on Angel Island on June 12, 1962, the day after the escape, with footprints leading away from it. Furthermore, a 1955 blue Chevrolet (California license plate KPB076) was reported stolen in Marin County the same day—a claim corroborated by contemporaneous stories in the Humboldt Times and the San Francisco Examiner.

The same year, an 89-year-old man named Bud Morris, who claimed he was a cousin of Frank Morris, said that on "eight or nine" occasions prior to the escape he delivered envelopes of money to Alcatraz guards, presumably as bribes. He further claimed to have met his cousin face to face in a San Diego park shortly after the escape. His daughter, who was "eight or nine" years old at the time, said she was present at the meeting with "Dad's friend, Frank", but "had no idea [about the escape]".

A 2014 study of the ocean currents by scientists at Delft University concluded that if the prisoners left Alcatraz at 11:30p.m. on June11, they could have made it to Horseshoe Bay, just north of the Golden Gate Bridge, and that any debris would have floated in the direction of Angel Island, consistent with where the paddle and belongings were actually found.  If they left before or after that time, they said, tides and currents were such that their chances of survival were slim.

A 2015 History Channel documentary entitled Alcatraz: Search for the Truth presented further circumstantial evidence gathered over the years by the Anglin family. Kenneth and David Widner displayed Christmas cards containing the Anglins' handwriting, and allegedly received by family members for three years after the escape. While the handwriting was verified as the Anglins', none of the envelopes contained a postmarked stamp, so experts could not determine when they had been delivered. The family cited a story from family friend Fred Brizzi, who grew up with the brothers and claimed to have recognized them in Rio de Janeiro in 1975. They produced photographs purportedly taken by Brizzi, including one of two men, who according to Brizzi were John and Clarence Anglin, standing next to a large termite mound. Other photos showed a Brazilian farm that Brizzi claimed was owned by the men. Forensic experts working for the family confirmed that the photos were taken in 1975, and asserted that the two men were "more than likely" the Anglins, although the age and condition of the photo, and the fact that both men were wearing sunglasses, hindered efforts to make a definitive determination. Brizzi also presented an alternative escape theory: Rather than use the raft to cross the bay, he said, they paddled around the island to the boat dock, where they attached an electrical cord—which was reported missing from the dock on the night of the escape—to the rudder of a prison ferry that departed the island shortly after midnight, and were towed behind it to the mainland. 

Art Roderick, a retired Deputy U.S. Marshal who had once headed the investigation and later worked with the Anglin family, called Brizzi's photograph of the two men "absolutely the best actionable lead we've had," but added, "it could still all be a nice story which isn't true"; or the photograph could be a misdirection, aimed at steering the investigation away from the Anglins' actual whereabouts. Michael Dyke, the last Deputy Marshal assigned to the case, said Brizzi was "a drug smuggler and a con man," and was suspicious of his account. Brizzi's widow said that she never heard him mention seeing the Anglin brothers in Rio, and that he was “a con man” who was prone to making up stories. An expert working for the U.S. Marshal's Service did not believe the photograph was legitimate. Dyke said measurements of the physical characteristics of the Anglin brothers indicate that they are not the men in the Brazil photo, but he acknowledged the difficulty in making a definitive determination and ruling it out as a valid lead.  In January 2020, an Irish creative agency and AI specialists at Identv used facial recognition techniques to conclude that the men in the photo were John and Clarence Anglin.

Robert Anglin reportedly told family members before his death in 2010 that he had been in contact with John and Clarence from 1963 until approximately 1987. Surviving family members, who said they have heard nothing since Robert lost contact with the brothers in 1987, announced plans to travel to Brazil to conduct a personal search; but Roderick cautioned that they could be arrested by Brazilian authorities because the Alcatraz escape remains an open Interpol case.

In 2018, the FBI confirmed the existence of a letter, allegedly written by John Anglin and received by the San Francisco Police Department in 2013. The writer asserted that Frank Morris died in 2008 and was buried in Alexandria under a different name, and Clarence Anglin died in 2011. His purpose in writing the letter, he said, was to negotiate his surrender in exchange for medical treatment of his cancer. The letter's authenticity was deemed inconclusive.

In a 2019 episode of the series Mission Declassified, investigative journalist Christof Putzel corroborated much of the information released by the FBI and other sources, including the raft found on Angel Island. He quoted various reports mentioning a blue Chevrolet, of the same description as the one stolen after the escape, spotted in Oklahoma, Indiana, Ohio, and South Carolina, where, three months after the escape, three men matching the escapees' description attempted to acquire a residence in the woods.

In popular culture
J. Campbell Bruce's 1963 book Escape from Alcatraz documents the 1962 escape, along with other escape attempts over the 29 years that Alcatraz Island served as a prison.

The film Escape from Alcatraz (1979) stars Clint Eastwood, Fred Ward, and Jack Thibeau as Frank Morris, John Anglin, and Clarence Anglin, respectively. West (fictionalized as a character named Charley Butts) was played by Larry Hankin.

The escape was shown in a two-part 1980 TV movie Alcatraz: The Whole Shocking Story, which starred Ed Lauter as Morris, and Louis Giambalvo and Antony Ponzini as the Anglins.

Terror on Alcatraz (1987) stars Aldo Ray as Morris, returning decades later to the scene of his escape from Alcatraz and scouring his old prison cell for a map to a safe deposit box key.

Previous attempts

Of the 36 inmates who staged 14 escape attempts over the 29 years that Alcatraz served as a federal penitentiary, 23 were recaptured, six were shot and killed, two drowned, and five (Morris, the Anglins, and Theodore Cole and Ralph Roe) are listed as "missing and presumed drowned."

See also
 List of fugitives from justice who disappeared
 List of people who disappeared mysteriously at sea

References

Sources

1962 crimes in the United States
1962 in California
Escapes and escape attempts from Alcatraz
Fugitives
June 1962 events in the United States
People lost at sea